{{DISPLAYTITLE:Delta1 Tauri}}

Delta¹ Tauri (δ¹ Tauri, abbreviated Delta¹ Tau, δ¹ Tau) is a double star in the zodiac constellation of Taurus. Based upon an annual parallax shift of 20.96 mas as seen from Earth, it is located roughly 156 light-years distant from the Sun. The system is faintly visible to the naked eye with a combined apparent visual magnitude of +3.772. It is considered a member of the Hyades cluster.

The two constituents are designated δ¹ Tauri A and B. A is itself a binary star with components designated δ¹ Tauri Aa (officially named Secunda Hyadum , the traditional name for the entire system) and Ab.

Nomenclature 

δ¹ Tauri (Latinised to Delta¹ Tauri) is the system's Bayer designation. The designations of the two constituents as Delta¹ Tauri A and B, and those of A's components - Delta¹ Tauri Aa and Ab - derive from the convention used by the Washington Multiplicity Catalog (WMC) for multiple star systems, and adopted by the International Astronomical Union (IAU).

The system bore the traditional name Hyadum II, which is Latin for "Second of the Hyades". In 2016, the IAU organized a Working Group on Star Names (WGSN) to catalog and standardize proper names for stars. The WGSN decided to attribute proper names to individual stars rather than entire multiple systems. It approved the name Secunda Hyadum for the component Delta¹ Tauri Aa on 5 September 2017 and it is now so included in the List of IAU-approved Star Names.

Properties 

Delta¹ Tauri A is a single-lined spectroscopic binary with an orbital period of 529.8 days and an eccentricity of 0.42. The 'CN0.5' suffix indicates a mild overabundance of cyanogen in the outer atmosphere. The primary, component Aa, has 2.8 times the mass of the Sun, while the secondary, component Ab, has 1.3 times the Sun's mass.

Delta¹ Tauri B is a magnitude 13.21 visual companion separated by 111.8 arcseconds from A. It is most likely not physically related to the main star.

References

G-type giants
Spectroscopic binaries
Hyades (star cluster)
Tauri, Delta
Taurus (constellation)
Secunda Hyadum
Durchmusterung objects
Tauri, 061
027697
020455
1373